Łostowicki cemetery is the largest cemetery in Gdańsk.

The cemetery was founded in 1906. At first it was a local cemetery for the local parish of Saint Francis of Assisi.

External links

 Homepage
 

Cemeteries in Poland
Gdańsk